Marita Sandig (later Gasch, born 4 April 1958) is a German rower who won a gold medal in the eights at the 1980 Summer Olympics. She won four world championships from 1977 to 1983, three with Silvia Fröhlich, and came in second twice. She was married to Uwe Gasch, another retired Olympian rower.

References 

1958 births
Living people
People from Zwickau (district)
People from Bezirk Karl-Marx-Stadt
East German female rowers
Sportspeople from Saxony
Olympic rowers of East Germany
Rowers at the 1980 Summer Olympics
Olympic gold medalists for East Germany
Olympic medalists in rowing
World Rowing Championships medalists for East Germany
Medalists at the 1980 Summer Olympics
Recipients of the Patriotic Order of Merit in silver